"Do That Stuff" is a song by the funk band Parliament. It was the first single released from their 1976 album The Clones of Dr. Funkenstein. It peaked at number 22 on the U.S. R&B chart.

Sampling 
Actress and R&B singer Tatyana Ali sampled part of the song in her song, "Getting Closer" from the Wild Wild West soundtrack.
Electronic duo Röyksopp sampled a part of the song in their single, "Happy Up Here", off their album Junior.
Hip-hop duo Nice & Smooth sampled a part of the song in their song "Funky for You" off their album Nice and Smooth.
Berlin-based duo Stereo Total sampled a part of the song in their song "Beauty Case" off their album My Melody.
Russian electropop band Diskoteka Avariya sampled a part of the song in their track "Рэп для моей девчонки" ("Rjep dlja moej devchonki", Rap for my chick) off their debut album  "Танцуй со мной" ("Tancuj so mnoj", Dance with Me) in 1997

References

Parliament (band) songs
1976 singles
Songs written by George Clinton (funk musician)
Casablanca Records singles
Songs written by Bernie Worrell
1976 songs
Songs written by Garry Shider